Collinda Joseph (born May 15, 1965) is a Canadian wheelchair curler. Collinda and her husband, Euan, have two children: Sara and Hannah.

Teams

References

External links 
 
 
 
 Video: 

1965 births
Living people
Canadian women curlers
Canadian wheelchair curlers
Paralympic medalists in wheelchair curling
Paralympic bronze medalists for Canada
Wheelchair curlers at the 2022 Winter Paralympics
Medalists at the 2022 Winter Paralympics
Curlers from Ottawa